Franz Gabl (29 December 1921 – 23 January 2014) was an Austrian alpine skier and Olympic medalist. He received a silver medal in the downhill at the 1948 Winter Olympics in St. Moritz.

References

External links 
 Franz Gabl's obituary

1921 births
2014 deaths
Olympic alpine skiers of Austria
Austrian male alpine skiers
Alpine skiers at the 1948 Winter Olympics
Olympic silver medalists for Austria
Olympic medalists in alpine skiing
Medalists at the 1948 Winter Olympics